Abdelkader Horr (born 10 November 1953) is an Algerian football defender who played for Algeria in the 1982 FIFA World Cup. He also played for DNC Alger.

References

External links
FIFA profile

1953 births
Footballers from Algiers
Algerian footballers
Algeria international footballers
Association football defenders
African Games gold medalists for Algeria
African Games medalists in football
Mediterranean Games bronze medalists for Algeria
Competitors at the 1979 Mediterranean Games
1980 African Cup of Nations players
1982 African Cup of Nations players
1982 FIFA World Cup players
Mediterranean Games medalists in football
Living people
Competitors at the 1978 All-Africa Games
21st-century Algerian people
20th-century Algerian people